The legality of abortion in the United States and the various restrictions imposed on the procedure vary significantly depending on the laws of each state or other jurisdiction. Some states prohibit abortion at all stages of pregnancy with few exceptions, others permit it up to a certain point in a woman's pregnancy, while others allow abortion throughout a woman's pregnancy. In states where abortion is legal, several classes of restrictions on the procedure may exist, such as parental consent or notification laws, requirements that patients be shown an ultrasound before obtaining an abortion, mandatory waiting periods, and counseling requirements. Abortion laws tend to be the most strict in the Southern United States and the most lenient in the Northeastern and Western United States.

From 1973 to 2022, Supreme Court rulings in Roe v. Wade (1973) and Planned Parenthood v. Casey (1992), respectively, created and maintained federal protections for a pregnant woman's right to get an abortion, ensuring that states could not ban abortion prior to the point at which a fetus may be deemed viable. However, Roe and Casey were overturned by Dobbs v. Jackson Women's Health Organization (2022), and states may now impose any regulation on abortion, provided it satisfies rational basis review and does not otherwise conflict with federal law. Prior to the Court’s decision in Dobbs, many states enacted trigger laws to ban abortion should Roe be overturned. Additionally, several states either have enacted or are in the process of enacting stricter abortion laws following Dobbs, and some have resumed enforcement of laws in effect prior to 1973. While such laws are no longer considered to violate the United States Constitution, they continue to face some legal challenges in state courts.

Current legal status nationwide 

Individual states have broad discretion to prohibit or regulate abortion and the legal position varies considerably from state to state. The Supreme Court had removed this discretion, and created a federal right to abortion, with the 1973 Roe v. Wade judgement, but this ruling was reversed 49 years later by the Supreme Court's ruling in the 2022 Dobbs v. Jackson case. States have passed laws to restrict late-term abortions, require parental notification for minors, and mandate the disclosure of abortion risk information to patients prior to the procedure. Currently, legislatures in 22 states state they would move to ban or further restrict abortion laws throughout the U.S.

The key deliberated article of the US Constitution is the Fourteenth Amendment, which states that:

The official report of the US Senate Judiciary Committee, issued in 1983 after extensive hearings on the Human Life Amendment (proposed by Senators Orrin Hatch and Thomas Eagleton), stated:

A number of states limit elective abortions to a maximum number of weeks into pregnancy, usually prior to when the fetus could survive if removed from the womb. For comparative purposes, the youngest child thought to have survived a premature birth in the United States was Curtis Means born on July 5, 2020 in Birmingham, Alabama, at 21 weeks and 1 day gestational age or 148 days, vs. possibly expected gestational period of 40 weeks, approx. 280 days.

Compared to other developed countries, the procedure is more available in the United States in terms of how late the abortion can legally be performed. However, in terms of other aspects such as government funding, privacy for non-adults, or geographical access, some US states are far more restrictive. In most European countries abortion-on-demand is allowed only during the first trimester, with abortions during later stages of pregnancy allowed only for specific reasons (e.g. physical or mental health reasons, risk of birth defects, if the woman was raped etc.). The reasons that can be invoked by a woman seeking an abortion after the first trimester vary by country, for instance, some countries, such as Denmark, provide a wide range of reasons, including social and economic ones.

There are no national laws or restrictions regulating abortion in Canada, although each individual province sets its own guidelines. In Australia, the law on abortion varies by state/territory. In many countries, abortion has been legalized by respective parliaments, while in the US abortion has previously been deemed a constitutional right by the Supreme Court, although this was reversed in 2022.

Because of the split between federal and state law, legal access to abortion continues to vary somewhat by state. Geographic availability, however, varies dramatically, with 87 percent of US counties having no abortion provider. Moreover, due to the Hyde Amendment, many state health programs which poor women rely on for their health care do not cover abortions; currently only 17 states (including California, Illinois and New York) offer or require such coverage.

The 1992 case of Planned Parenthood v. Casey overturned Roe's strict trimester formula, but reemphasized the right to abortion as grounded in the general sense of liberty and privacy protected under the Due Process Clause of the Fourteenth Amendment to the United States Constitution:

Advancements in medical technology meant that a fetus might be considered viable, and thus have some basis of a right to life, at 22 or 23 weeks rather than at the 28 that was more common at the time Roe was decided. For this reason, the old trimester formula was ruled obsolete, with a new focus on viability of the fetus.

Since 1995, led by Congressional Republicans, the US House of Representatives and US Senate have moved several times to pass measures banning the procedure of intact dilation and extraction, also commonly known as partial birth abortion. After several long and emotional debates on the issue, such measures passed twice by wide margins, but President Bill Clinton vetoed those bills in April 1996 and October 1997 respectively, on the grounds that they did not include health exceptions. Congressional supporters of the bill argued that a health exception would render the bill unenforceable, since the Doe v. Bolton decision defined "health" in vague terms, justifying any motive for obtaining an abortion. Subsequent Congressional attempts at overriding the veto were unsuccessful. On October 2, 2003, with a vote of 281–142, the House again approved a measure banning the procedure, called the Partial-Birth Abortion Ban Act. Through this legislation, a doctor could face up to two years in prison and face civil lawsuits for performing such an abortion. A woman who undergoes the procedure cannot be prosecuted under the measure. The measure contains an exemption to allow the procedure if the woman's life is threatened.

On October 21, 2003, the United States Senate passed the same bill by a vote of 64–34, with a number of Democrats joining in support. The bill was signed by President George W. Bush on November 5, 2003, but a federal judge blocked its enforcement in several states just a few hours after it became public law. The Supreme Court upheld the nationwide ban on the procedure in the case Gonzales v. Carhart on April 18, 2007. The 5–4 ruling said the Partial-Birth Abortion Ban Act does not conflict with previous Court decisions regarding abortion. The decision marked the first time the court allowed a ban on any type of abortion since 1973. The swing vote, which came from moderate justice Anthony Kennedy, was joined by Justices Antonin Scalia, Clarence Thomas, and the two recent appointees, Samuel Alito and Chief Justice John Roberts. Gonzales was eventually followed by United States v. Texas and Whole Women's Health v. Jackson, and finally superseded by Dobbs v. Jackson.

State regulatory initiatives regarding abortion 

The following states have or had initiatives regarding abortion. The fetal heartbeat bill legislative approach picked up momentum in 2018 and 2019.

Alabama 

Following the Supreme Court overruling of Roe v. Wade  on June 24, 2022, abortion is illegal in Alabama.

Performing an abortion is a Class A felony with up to 99 years in prison, and attempted abortion is a Class C felony punishable by 1 to 10 years in prison, under a law passed in May 2019. The law was enjoined, but once Roe had been overturned, the law came into effect. The law makes exceptions to save the pregnant woman's life or physical health, or if the fetus has a fatal fetal anomaly.  There are no exceptions for rape or incest.

Abortion is a divisive issue in the state, with 37% of adults believing it should be legal in all or most cases and 58% believing it should be illegal in all or most cases. Alabama's political and overarching religious beliefs has presented Alabama residents with limited access to abortion services. As of 2021, only three clinics remained in Alabama, all of which were located in metropolitan areas of the state.

Alaska
As long as a licensed physician performs the procedure, abortion is legal in Alaska at all stages of pregnancy. Minors under the age of 17 must have parental consent.

In 2019, House Bill 178 was proposed, which would have banned abortion with no exceptions. The Bill was withdrawn.

Arizona
Abortion is legal up to 15 weeks of pregnancy, though legal challenges to conflicting abortion laws continue. Patients must meet with a physician at least 24 hours before the procedure, and a licensed physician must perform the procedure. Minors under the age of 18 must receive parental consent.

Arkansas
After the Supreme Court overturned Roe v. Wade on June 24, 2022, a 2021 trigger law took effect in Arkanas that banned abortions. The ban has an exception for abortions performed to save the life of the pregnant woman, though it is possible an exception will be made in rape and incest cases in the future. Doctors determined to have performed an abortion face up to 10 years in prison and fines up to $100,000.

California
Abortion is legal in California up to the point of fetal viability. Nurse-midwives and other non-physician medical personnel with proper training may perform the procedure. Public universities are required by law to provide Mifepristone at no cost to students.  In November 2022, California voters passed Proposition 1, enshrining the right to abortion and contraception in the state constitution.

Colorado 

Abortion is legal at all stages of pregnancy in Colorado. Minors' parents or legal guardians must receive notice before the procedure.

In 2008, Kristine and Michael Burton of Colorado for Equal Rights proposed Colorado Amendment 48, an initiative to amend the definition of a person to "any human being from the moment of fertilization." On November 4, 2008, the initiative was turned down by 73.2 percent of the voters.

The state passed the Reproductive Health Equity Act into law in April 2022, which protects abortion rights and assures "every individual has a fundamental right to make decisions about the individual's reproductive health care, including the fundamental right to use or refuse contraception; a pregnant individual has a fundamental right to continue a pregnancy and give birth or to have an abortion and to make decisions about how to exercise that right; and a fertilized egg, embryo, or fetus does not have independent or derivative rights under the laws of the state."

Connecticut

Abortion in Connecticut is legal up to the point of fetal viability, or after that if necessary to preserve the life or health (including mental health) of the pregnant woman.

The 1821 abortion law of Connecticut was the first known law passed in America to restrict abortion. Although this law did not completely outlaw abortions, it placed heavier restrictions as it prevented women from attempting or receiving abortions, which was generally through the consumption of poison, during the first four months of a woman's pregnancy.

Delaware

Abortion in Delaware is legal up to the point of fetal viability. 55% of adults said in a poll by the Pew Research Center that abortion should be legal in all or most cases. There was a therapeutic exceptions in the state's legislative ban on abortions by 1900. Informed consent laws were on the books by 2007. As of May 14, 2019, the state prohibited abortions after the fetus was viable, generally some point between week 24 and 28. This period uses a standard defined by the US Supreme Court in 1973 with the Roe v. Wade ruling.

Florida

Until 2022, abortion in Florida was legal up to the 24th week of pregnancy. 56% of adults said in a poll by the Pew Research Center that abortion should be legal in all or most cases. An abortion ban with therapeutic exception was in place by 1900.  Such laws were in place after the American Medical Association sought to criminalize abortion in 1857. By 2007, the state had a customary informed consent provision for abortions. By 2013, state Targeted Regulation of Abortion Providers (TRAP) law applied to medication induced abortions. Attempts to ban abortion took place in 2011, 2012, 2013, 2014, 2015 and 2016. Two fetal heartbeat bills were filed in the Florida Legislature in 2019, and the Florida Legislature outlawed abortion after 15 weeks in 2022.

Georgia 

The constitutionality of the law was challenged by the American Civil Liberties Union, Planned Parenthood, and the Center for Reproductive Rights. In October 2019, the federal judge overseeing the case blocked enforcement of the ban, which was to take effect in January 2020, stating that the plaintiffs have shown a likelihood of winning the case.

Hawaii

As of 2017, there are 28 clinics in Hawaii that will perform abortions. As of January 2021, an abortion can be performed after viability if the patient's life or overall health is in danger.

Idaho

Abortion in Idaho is illegal.  The only exceptions are rape, incest and to save the pregnant person's life.

Illinois
Abortion is legal in Illinois up to 24 weeks. Parental consent is not required for minors, however a guardian over the age of 21 must be notified unless an exception is granted by a judge. , Illinois had 40 facilities that can perform abortions.  In 2019, the Illinois state legislature passed into law the Reproductive Health Act, which repealed all earlier state restrictions on abortion and codified abortion and contraception rights into state law.

Indiana

, abortion in Indiana is legal as an abortion ban is temporarily blocked by courts. The ban makes abortion illegal except in cases of rape or incest before 10 weeks post-fertilization, for fatal fetal abnormalities, or to preserve the life and physical health of the mother. New 2021 laws put in place in the state require an ultrasound be shown to the patient at least 18 hours prior to the procedure, and the patient must receive state-mandated counseling. If the patient seeking an abortion is a minor, they must obtain parental consent before moving forward.

Iowa

Abortion is legal in Iowa up to 22 weeks.

On March 26, 2020, Governor Kim Reynolds expanded upon previous COVID-19 disaster proclamations to halt elective and non-essential surgeries. The following day her office asserted: "[The] Proclamation suspends all nonessential or elective surgeries and procedures until April 16th, that includes surgical abortion procedures".

Kansas

Abortion in Kansas is legal up to 20 weeks.  Parental consent is required for minors under the age of 18. 

Kansas lawmakers approved sweeping anti-abortion legislation (HB 2253) on April 6, 2013, that says life begins at fertilization, forbids abortion based on gender and bans Planned Parenthood from providing sex education in schools.

In 2015, Kansas became the first state to ban the dilation and evacuation procedure, a common second-trimester abortion procedure. But the new law was later struck down by the Kansas Court of Appeals in January 2016 without ever having gone into effect. 
In April 2019, the Kansas Supreme Court affirmed the lower court's decision, and ruled that the right to abortion is inherent within the state's constitution and bill of rights, such that even if Roe v. Wade were overturned and the federal protection of abortion rights is withdrawn, the right would still be allowed within Kansas, barring a change in the state constitution. After both Houses of the Kansas State Legislature passed a constitutional amendment to overturn the Kansas Supreme Court's ruling, the proposed amendment was subject to a voter referendum. The referendum resulted in a decisive rejection of the amendment (and thus an affirmation that the Kansas Constitution contains a right to an abortion) on August 2, 2022.

Kentucky
After the Supreme Court overturned Roe v. Wade on June 24, 2022, a 2019 trigger law took effect in Kentucky that banned abortions. The law makes all abortions illegal except when medically mandatory to prevent the patient from dying or getting a "life-sustaining organ" permanently impaired.  There are no exceptions for rape or incest.

Performing an abortion is now a Class C felony, with imprisonment of 5 to 10 years and fines of $1,000 to $10,000.

The ACLU announced plans to sue the state in court, claiming that the state constitution recognizes abortion as a right. On June 30, 2022, Jefferson County Circuit Judge Mitch Perry issued a temporary restraining order blocking enforcement of the state's abortion ban pending further hearings to determine if the ban violates the Kentucky Constitution. This order temporarily allows both elective abortion providers, which are both located in Louisville, to temporarily resume elective abortions. Both the Kentucky Court of Appeals and the Kentucky Supreme Court refused a request to dissolve the restraining order.

In November 2022, Kentucky voters rejected an amendment that would have denied any right to abortion in the state constitution.

Louisiana

On June 19, 2006, Governor Kathleen Blanco signed into law a trigger ban on most forms of abortion (unless the life of the mother was in danger or her health would be permanently damaged) once it passed the state legislature. Although she felt exclusions for rape or incest would have "been reasonable," she felt she should not veto based on those reasons. The trigger law would only go into effect if the United States Supreme Court reversed Roe v. Wade. The law would allow the prosecution of any person who performed or aided in an abortion. The penalties include up to 10 years in prison and a maximum fine of $100,000.

When the Supreme Court overturned Roe v. Wade on June 24, 2022, Louisiana immediately banned all abortions except those performed to save the mother's life or in the case of a fetal abnormality. There are no exceptions for rape or incest.  On June 27, in response to a lawsuit by Hope Medical Group for Women and Medical Students for Choice, a judge issued a temporary restraining order which allowed abortions to resume in the state.

Earlier in 2022, "Republicans in the state legislature considered legislation classifying abortion as a homicide," which would mean that women who obtained abortions could be charged with murder.

Maine

Abortion is legal up to the point of fetal viability in Maine. Physicians, physician's assistants, nurse practitioners, and other professional medical providers may perform the procedure.

Maryland

Abortion in Maryland is legal up to the point of fetal viability.  Parental notification is required for minors under the age of 18.

Massachusetts

Abortion in Massachusetts is legal up to 24 weeks.  Parental consent is required for minors under the age of 16.   In December 2020, the Massachusetts state legislature enshrined abortion rights into state law.

Michigan

Abortion in Michigan is legal up to the point of fetal viability.  Parental consent is required for minors under the age of 18.   In November 2022, Michigan voters passed a state constitutional amendment to explicitly guarantee abortion rights, adding the right to abortion and contraception to the Michigan state constitution.

Minnesota 

Abortion in Minnesota is legal at all stages of pregnancy.  In January 2023, the Minnesota state legislature passed a bill enshrining the right to abortion and contraception into Minnesota statutes.  The Minnesota Supreme Court had previously ruled in 1995 that the Minnesota state constitution conferred a right to abortion.

Mississippi 

In 2007, Mississippi implemented a trigger law that would ban abortions within 10 days following the overruling of Roe v. Wade, which occurred on June 24, 2022. The laws provides exceptions when the mother's life is in danger, as well as in rape cases. Attempted or completed abortion is punishable with a maximum of 10 years imprisonment.

Missouri 
After the Supreme Court overturned Roe v. Wade on June 24, 2022, Missouri banned abortions. An exception is provided when the life of the mother is severely at risk.  There are no exceptions for rape or incest. Those who induce an abortion will face felony charges with up to 15 years in prison. While doctors are only permitted to perform abortions in cases of medical emergency under Missouri law, Section 188.017, the law "protects any woman who receives an illegal abortion from being prosecuted in violation of the Act." In addition, providers who perform or induce "an abortion because of a medical emergency . . . shall have the burden of persuasion that the defense is more probably true than not." The near-total ban on abortions is currently being challenged in court.

Montana 

Abortion in Montana is legal up to the point of fetal viability.  Parental consent is required for minors under the age of 16.   In November 2022, Montana voters rejected a measure that would have given embryos and fetuses legal personhood status.

Nebraska 

Abortion in Nebraska is legal up to 20 weeks.  Parental consent is required for minors under the age of 18.

Nevada 

Abortion in Nevada is legal up to 24 weeks.

New Hampshire 

Abortion in New Hampshire is legal up to 24 weeks.  Parental consent is required for minors under the age of 18.

New Jersey 

Abortion in New Jersey is legal at all stages of pregnancy.

New Mexico 

Abortion in New Mexico is legal at all stages of pregnancy.

New York 
New York is known in the U.S. as a reproductive sanctuary state. This means that abortion is legal and seen as health care provided by the state. There are approximately 252 facilities in New York that perform abortions. In 2019 New York codified abortions laws and protection in state law. New York state Senator Alessandra Biaggi has proposed a bill that allows the option for taxpayers in New York to contribute to the abortion access fund on their tax forms. This essentially helps create more access to abortion in the state.

North Carolina 

Abortion in North Carolina is legal up to 20 weeks.  Parental consent is required for minors under the age of 18.  A minor under the age of 18 may obtain a judicial bypass, which overrides the parental consent requirement.

North Dakota 

Abortion is legal in North Dakota up to 22 weeks.  A near-total abortion ban has been indefinitely blocked in court.

After the Supreme Court overturned Roe v. Wade on June 24, 2022, North Dakota moved to ban "almost all abortions except in the case of rape, incest or where the mother’s life is at risk." The ban has been temporarily blocked by a court. Performing an abortion under the proposed ban is a Class C felony, punishable by up to five years in prison and up to a $10,000 fine.

Ohio 

Abortion is legal in Ohio up to 22 weeks.  A 6 week abortion ban has been indefinitely blocked in court.

Ohio has multiple layers of law which makes abortion illegal, resulting from multiple passed laws over the decades. The list below ranges from most strict to least.

ORC 2919.198 went into effect July 2019 that made abortion illegal after a "fetal heartbeat" can be detected, which is usually between five or six weeks after the first day of the woman's last  menstrual period. No exceptions are made for rape, incest, or a fetus determined to have down syndrome. However, an exception is made for medical emergencies, defined as a "serious risk of the substantial and irreversible impairment of a major bodily function of the pregnant woman."

Included in this law is a section called "immunity of pregnant woman," which overrides penalties for pregnant women who undertake an abortion after a "fetal heartbeat" has been detected. This release of penalties does not extend to physicians or doctors who administers the abortion past a detectable heartbeat.

According to ORC 2919.17, abortion may not be performed after viability, which, per ORC 2919.16, "means the stage of development of a human fetus at which in the determination of a physician, based on the particular facts of a woman's pregnancy that are known to the physician and in light of medical technology and information reasonably available to the physician, there is a realistic possibility of the maintaining and nourishing of a life outside of the womb with or without temporary artificial life-sustaining support." Viability tends to occur in the 24th week of pregnancy.

According to ORC 2919.201, abortion may not be performed if "the probable post-fertilization age of the unborn child is twenty weeks or greater." Immunity is not provided in a separate section similar to ORC 2919.198.

Oklahoma 

In 2016, Oklahoma state legislators passed a bill to criminalize abortion for providers, potentially charging them with up to three years in prison. On May 20, 2016, Governor Mary Fallin vetoed the bill before it could become law, citing its wording as too vague to withstand a legal challenge.

Governor Kevin Stitt signed three bills in 2021 that introduced new restrictions on abortion. One bill would revoke a medical license for people who perform abortions, another would ban abortions if a heartbeat is detected, and the third would require board-certified OB-GYN doctors be the only ones who can perform abortions.

As of 2022, abortion is currently illegal in most cases in Oklahoma. Oklahoma's abortion ban took effect on May 25, 2022, when Governor Kevin Stitt signed HB 4327 into law, and abortion providers have ceased offering services in Oklahoma as of that date. HB 4327 is modeled after the Texas Heartbeat Act and is enforced solely through civil lawsuits brought by private citizens, making it exceedingly difficult for abortion providers to challenge the constitutionality of the statute in court.

On April 12, 2022, Governor Kevin Stitt signed into law a bill that banned abortion indefinitely, unless the life of the mother was at stake, with no exceptions to rape and incest. The penalty for performing an abortion is two to five years imprisonment.

Oregon 

Abortion in Oregon is legal at all stages of pregnancy. In 2017 there were 20 facilities providing abortions in Oregon. As of January 2021, they do not have any major restriction on abortion, including no waiting period or parental consent.

Pennsylvania 

Abortion in Pennsylvania is legal up to 24 weeks.  Parental consent is required for minors under the age of 18.

Rhode Island 
Abortion is legal in Rhode Island up to the point of fetal viability. 71% of residents reported support of passing laws to protect safe abortion in 2018. There are restrictions in Rhode Island such as parental consent and clinic regulations in order to perform the precedure.

South Carolina 

Abortion in South Carolina is legal up to 22 weeks.  Parental consent is required for minors under the age of 17.   In January 2023, the South Carolina Supreme Court ruled that a 6 week abortion ban violates the state constitution.

South Dakota 

After the Supreme Court overturned Roe v. Wade on June 24, 2022, South Dakota banned abortions. The trigger law for the ban had been enacted in 2005. Under the new law, anyone who induces an abortion is "guilty of a Class 6 felony," with a maximum of two years imprisonment and $4,000 in fines. An exception is included to "preserve the life of the pregnant female," given "appropriate and reasonable medical judgment."  There are no exceptions for rape or incest.

Tennessee 
In 2019, Tennessee enacted a trigger law that would ban abortions 30 days after the overruling of Roe v. Wade. The law is a total ban on abortions with no exceptions making all abortions illegal. A person charged with the crime of providing an abortion may assert an affirmative defense against the charge that the abortion was performed to save the life of the mother. Anyone determined to have induced an abortion could face 3–15 years in prison, as well as up to $10,000 in fines.

Texas 

The Roe v. Wade case, tried in Texas, stands at the center of years of national debate about the issue of abortion. Henry Wade was serving as District Attorney of Dallas County at the time.

On August 29, 2014, US District Judge Lee Yeakel struck down as unconstitutional two provisions of Texas' omnibus anti-abortion bill, House Bill 2 that was to come into effect on September 1. The regulation would have closed about a dozen abortion clinics, leaving only eight places in Texas to get a legal abortion, all located in major cities. Judge Lee Yeakel ruled that the state's regulation was unconstitutional and would have placed an undue burden on women, particularly on poor and rural women living in west Texas and the Rio Grande Valley. The legal challenge to the law eventually reached the Supreme Court in Whole Woman's Health v. Hellerstedt (2016) which ruled that the law was unconstitutional, its burden of requiring abortion doctors to have admission privileges at a local hospital within 30 miles of the center to interfere with a woman's right to an abortion from Roe v. Wade.

In May 2021, Texas lawmakers passed the Texas Heartbeat Act, banning abortions as soon cardiac activity can be detected, typically as early as six weeks into pregnancy and often before women know they are pregnant. In order to avoid traditional constitutional challenges based on Roe v. Wade, the law provides that any non-government employee or official, excepting sexual perpetrators who conceived the fetus, may sue anyone that performs or induces an abortion in violation of the statute, as well as anyone who "aids or abets the performance or inducement of an abortion, including paying for or reimbursing the costs of an abortion through insurance or otherwise." The lawsuit may be filed by people either with or without any vested interest. The law contains an exception for abortions performed to save the mother's life. The law was challenged in courts, though had yet to have a full formal hearing as its September 1, 2021, enactment date came due. Plaintiffs sought an order from the U.S. Supreme Court to stop the law from coming into effect, but the Court issued a denial of the order late on September 1, 2021, allowing the law to remain in effect. While unsigned, Chief Justice John Roberts and Justice Stephen Breyer wrote dissenting opinions joined by Justices Elena Kagan and Sonia Sotomayor that they would have granted an injunction on the law until a proper judicial review.

On September 9, 2021, Attorney General Merrick Garland, the United States Department of Justice sued the State of Texas over the Texas Act on the basis that "the law is invalid under the Supremacy Clause and the Fourteenth Amendment, is preempted by federal law, and violates the doctrine of intergovernmental immunity". Garland further noted that the United States government has “an obligation to ensure that no state can deprive individuals of their constitutional rights.” The Complaint avers that Texas enacted the law "in open defiance of the Constitution". The relief requested from the U.S. District Court in Austin, Texas includes a declaration that the Texas Act is unconstitutional, and an injunction against state actors as well as any and all private individuals who may bring a SB 8 action. The suit was met with controversy, with critics citing concerns over the suit's politicized nature and the possible infringements on civilian rights.

After the Supreme Court overturned Roe v. Wade on June 24, 2022, Texas banned abortions except when the mother's life is at risk. Completed or attempted providing of abortion "will be charged with a first- or second-degree felony, and will be subject to a civil penalty of at least $100,000" for each abortion. A first degree felony in Texas is punishable by 5 to 99 years in prison, while a second degree felony is punishable by 2 to 20 years in prison, with "fines of up to $10,000" being possible.

Utah 
Abortion is legal in Utah for up to 18 weeks due to a ban at conception being temporarily blocked by courts. This ban includes exceptions if the mother's life is at risk, as well as in cases of lethal fetal abnormalities, severe brain abnormalities, rape, or incest. It is a second-degree felony to perform it, punishable by 1 to 15 years in prison, and a maximum possible fine of $10,000. On June 27, a Utah judge issued a 14-day restraining order to block enforcement of the law.

Vermont 

Abortion in Vermont is legal at all stages of pregnancy.  In November 2022, Vermont voters passed a bill that added an abortion rights amendment to the state constitution.

Virginia 

Abortion in Virginia is legal up to 25 weeks. Some limitations include insurance coverage depending in cases of sexual assault or serious health conditions. Parental consent is also required for minors in Virginia. In 2020, Virginia governor, Ralph Northam signed laws that removed many of the restrictions on abortion that had been in place for decades. Virginia became the first state to codify new protections for abortion in 2020.

Washington 

Abortion in Washington is legal up to the point of fetal viability.

West Virginia 

Abortion in West Virginia is banned unless necessarily to save the life or health of a pregnant woman, if the fetus has a fatal fetal anomaly, or if the pregnancy is the result of rape and reported prior to 11 weeks gestation. The near-total ban on abortions is currently being challenged in court.

Wisconsin 
In 2013, Act 37 was passed into law, necessitating admitting privileges for all abortion providers within the state. Admitting privileges allow physicians the right to directly admit a patient to a nearby hospital. The state maintained this was necessary for women's health and safety, however, public health officials and the medical community – including the American College of Gynecologists and Obstetricians, Wisconsin Medical Society, and American Public Health Association – oppose these requirements as unnecessary and are not grounded in evidence-based practice. Not only are these privileges difficult for abortion physicians to obtain given the controversial nature of abortion, the Wisconsin law required admitting privileges to be obtained within one day of the law's passage. After Governor Walker signed the bill into law, a federal district court judge in the Western District of Wisconsin immediately granted a preliminary injunction, preventing its implementation. A trial was held, and the court imposed a permanent injunction against the law, with the Judge noting that clinic closure was clearly the purpose of the law as there was only one day granted for physicians to obtain compliance. Further, the ruling found that abortion complications "are rare and are rarely dangerous", thus it seems to undermine the argument that this law is needed for women's health and safety.

The case was appealed by the state's attorney, yet the US Seventh Circuit Court of Appeals upheld the earlier ruling, and the permanent injunction. The appeals court declared, as did the trial court judge, that the state had failed to demonstrate any obvious need for this legislation. The state further appealed to the Supreme Court, however, this appeal was rejected, maintaining the permanent injunction of the law. The rejection by the Supreme Court to hear the case came rather quickly after the ruling in the state of Texas' case also involving admitting privileges. The Supreme Court's ruling in Whole Women's Health v. Hellerstedt found that the admitting privileges requirement created an undue burden for women, and thus interfered with the rights established in Roe v. Wade.

As of 2023, abortion providers in Wisconsin have temporarily stopped providing abortion services due to an 1849 abortion ban that went into effect on June 24, 2022.  The total ban on abortions is currently being challenged in court.

Wyoming 

Abortion is illegal in Wyoming unless the pregnant woman’s life or Health are in danger, the pregnancy is the result of a rape or the fetus has an fatal anomaly.  The current ban on abortions is currently being challenged in court.

Other polities

District of Columbia

The District of Columbia has no law with respect to abortion. The previous statute making abortion a criminal offense was repealed in 2004. The consequence of this repeal is that abortion is completely unregulated in the District throughout the period of pregnancy.

American Samoa 

Abortion was effectively illegal in American Samoa before Roe was overturned.

Guam 

Abortion is legal in Guam, despite several attempts at restriction, but hasn't been available since 2016 when the last provider retired.

Northern Mariana Islands 

Abortion was illegal in the Northern Mariana Islands before Roe was overturned.

Puerto Rico 

Abortion is legal in Puerto Rico without a gestational limit. A bill limiting abortions to 22 weeks passed the Senate in June 2022 and was sent to the House.

United States Virgin Islands 

Abortion is legal to 24 weeks. Residents of the British Virgin Islands often travel to the United States Virgin Islands for abortions.

State table

Limits on abortion 

Abortion is illegal at any gestational age in states displayed with a pink background. Additional limitations are given regardless, as the legality of abortion may change.

Protections of abortion

See also
 Abortion statistics in the United States
 Abortion by country
 Abortion and religion
 Abortion debate
 Heartbeat bill
 Types of abortion restrictions in the United States

Notes

References

External links
Legal
 Full Text of Roe v. Wade Decision
 Interactive maps comparing US abortion restrictions by state
 State Policies on Later-Term Abortions Guttmacher Institute

 
History of women's rights in the United States
States of the United States-related lists
Reproductive rights in the United States
Law of the United States